Nicollia may refer to:
 Nicollia, a genus of nematodes in the family Nicollinidae, synonym of Nicollina
 Nicollia, a genus of protists in the family Babesiidae, synonym of Babesia